The Definitive Collection: Cissy Houston is a compilation album by American soul/gospel singer Cissy Houston, released in the U.S. and UK in 2000. It consist primarily of songs from two Houston albums, 1977's Cissy Houston and 1978's Think It Over", as well as her hit singles "Warning-Danger" and  "Think It Over". Also featured are her cover versions which appeared on the two albums, such as "Make It Easy on Yourself", "Tomorrow", Elton John's "Your Song" and "He Ain't Heavy, He's My Brother".

Track listing

CD Album liner notes

Credits
Producer, Arranger & Conductor: Michael Zager

References

External links
Cissy Houston

2000 compilation albums
Cissy Houston albums